George Tuka or Heorhiy/Georgiy Tuka (born 24 November 1963) is a Ukrainian politician and activist. 
From 29 April 2016 to 29 August 2019 Tuka was Deputy Minister for the temporarily occupied territories and internally displaced persons in the Groysman government. In 2015 and 2016 he was governor of Luhansk Oblast.

Personal life 
George Tuka was born on 24 November 1963 in Kyiv. He graduated from the Kyiv Polytechnic Institute in 1986. He has a son who volunteered for the Armed Forces of Ukraine.

Career 
In 2009–2010, Tuka worked as head of sales at En Ti Telekom LLC. From 2011 to 2012 he was the director of Zenit-Telecom.

According to his own words he took part in Arab Spring protests in Egypt where he lived for two and a half years

Tuka joined the Euromaidan protests early on and was wounded by the Berkut special police force on 18 February 2014. He is a co-founder and coordinator of Narodnyi Tyl, a community volunteer movement. In 2014 he co-founded and was fifth on the list of the political party Ukraine is One Country (Ukrayina – Yedyna Krayina) during the 2014 Ukrainian parliamentary election.

In 2014, Narodnyi Tyl established a website titled "Myrotvorets" ("Peacemaker"), which lists the personal data of citizens described as "separatists" or "Kremlin agents" by the authors of the site. Several media have reported that it provided the personal data, including home address, of an assassinated former MP from the Party of Regions, Oleg Kalashnikov, and journalist and writer Oles Buzina. When asked about possible responsibility for the illegal distribution of personal data, he stated, "This site contains data on more than 25,000 men. More than 300 of them are either arrested or killed. So why should I worry about some two lowlifes who are guilty of war?"

On 22 July 2015, President Petro Poroshenko appointed Tuka governor of Luhansk Oblast. He was dismissed from this post by Poroshenko on 29 April 2016.

From 29 April 2016 to 29 August 2019, Tuka was appointed Deputy Minister for the temporarily occupied territories and internally displaced persons in the Groysman government.

Awards 
 Order of Merit, III grades

References

External links 
 Poroshenko appoints George Tuka Chairman of Luhansk Regional State Administration
 Army volunteer George Tuka: The internal enemy is more dangerous for Ukraine
 Fundraising for the Ukrainian Army. Volunteers who raise funds for the Ukrainian military share their motivations, worries and bank details for those who are willing to donate

1963 births
Living people
Politicians from Kyiv
Chevaliers of the Order of Merit (Ukraine)
Governors of Luhansk Oblast
Independent politicians in Ukraine
People of the Euromaidan
Pro-Ukrainian people of the war in Donbas